Broughton United was a Welsh football club based in New Broughton, Wrexham, Wales. They played their home games at Plas Power.

History

Formed some time in 1899 Broughton United were members of The Combination between 1903 and 1906. They also played in the Welsh Cup on five occasions, reaching the Quarter Finals three times. In 1906 the club withdrew from the Combination due to financial difficulties. Instead the club was due to enter the Wrexham and District League, however they do not appear in the final tables for the 1906-07 season. By 1907 the club were listed as defunct and its committee members were suspended by the Football Association of Wales.

Seasons

Cup History

Honours

League
Welsh Senior League
Winners (2): 1901, 1902

The Combination
Third (1): 1905

Cups
Denbighshire and Flintshire Charity Cup
Finalists (2): 1901, 1902 (outcome unknown)
Winners (1): 1901

References

Defunct football clubs in Wales
1899 establishments in Wales
1906 disestablishments in Wales
Sport in Wrexham
Sport in Wrexham County Borough
The Combination
Welsh football clubs in English leagues
Football clubs in Wrexham